= Independent engineer =

An independent engineer, also known as a lender's engineer, is a term often given to the engineering representative of the lender, or financier, of a large capital project. The key is to be independent so that opinions on the technical aspects of the project are not biased either in favor of the lenders or the developer/owners. To maintain independence, the independent engineer is typically selected by the lender but paid by the developer/owner.

The role of the independent engineer is to conduct an independent technical assessment of a project or technical due diligence. The qualifications of an independent engineer are unusual in that in addition to understanding the engineering aspects of a project, the independent engineer must also be well versed in the business aspects of project financing. This includes the assessment of the technical aspects of major contracts such as EPC contracts, power purchase agreement, off-take agreements, long-term service agreements, and O&M agreements. An independent engineer will review the technical inputs (output, efficiency, O&M expenses, availability, etc.) to the financial model used by the lender and the developer/owner to justify the financing of the project.

== Scope of work ==
While the role of an independent engineer is similar to an owner's engineer, they are distinctly different. An independent engineer will deal with the lenders and legal counsel on a regular basis to evaluate the financial health of the project as well as the technical aspects. Conversely, an owner's engineer more often deals directly with the engineer of record, the constructor, and equipment suppliers with a focus on ensuring that the technical details of the project meet the specifications.

Typical scopes of work for an independent engineer often include:

- Fatal flaw and/or technology reviews
- Project reviews to support project financing
  - Review of the engineering design
  - Assessment of project participants and the project site
  - Technology review
  - Contract reviews (non-legal)
  - Operations and maintenance review
  - Environmental review
  - Review of the technical inputs to the financial model
- Construction monitoring
  - Budget tracking and draw certifications
  - Monitoring of equipment and material compliance with specifications
  - Schedule and budget analysis
  - Project completion review and completion certifications
- Performance test monitoring
- Annual operational and maintenance review
